ISO 3166-2:UY is the entry for Uruguay in ISO 3166-2, part of the ISO 3166 standard published by the International Organization for Standardization (ISO), which defines codes for the names of the principal subdivisions (e.g., provinces or states) of all countries coded in ISO 3166-1.

Currently for Uruguay, ISO 3166-2 codes are defined for 19 departments.

Each code consists of two parts, separated by a hyphen. The second part is two letters.

Current codes
Subdivision names are listed as in the ISO 3166-2 standard published by the ISO 3166 Maintenance Agency (ISO 3166/MA).

Click on the button in the header to sort each column.

See also
 Subdivisions of Uruguay
 FIPS region codes of Uruguay

External links
 ISO Online Browsing Platform: UY
 Departments of Uruguay, Statoids.com

2:UY
ISO 3166-2
ISO 3166-2
Uruguay geography-related lists